James "Maffer" Davey (25 December 1880 – ) was a British rugby union player who competed in the Rugby event at the 1908 Summer Olympics.

He was born on Christmas Day in Redruth, Cornwall and played for Redruth R.F.C. as a fly-half. He then spent some years working in the gold mines of the Witwatersrand, captaining Transvaal from 1904 to 1906. On his return to Cornwall he played twice on the losing side for England, once in 1908 against Scotland and once in 1909 against Wales.

"Maffer" was capped 35 times for Cornwall and was a member of the county's famous Championship winning side of 1908 when they beat Durham in the final 17–3 at Redruth.

He was a member of the rugby team which won the silver medal at the 1908 Summer Olympics, when Cornwall represented Great Britain losing to Australia in the final. He also took part in the 1908 British Lions tour to New Zealand and Australia where he scored 5 tries in 13 appearances playing in one test match against New Zealand.

References

External links
profile

1880 births
1951 deaths
British & Irish Lions rugby union players from England
British rugby union players
Cornish rugby union players
England international rugby union players
Medalists at the 1908 Summer Olympics
Olympic rugby union players of Great Britain
Olympic silver medallists for Great Britain
Rugby union players at the 1908 Summer Olympics
Rugby union players from Redruth